The Speaker of the House of Assembly of Dominica is responsible for the management and general administration of the House, ensuring that rules of procedure are followed.  The Speaker is elected by the House of Assembly at its first sitting after a general election.

A member of the House who is elected as Speaker can only vote to break ties (a casting vote).  If someone outside the membership of the House is elected as Speaker, they become a member, but cannot cast an original or casting vote.

Louis Cools-Lartigue, OBE, was the speaker of its predecessor, the Legislative Council until 1967.

Presidents of the Legislative Council

Speakers of the Legislative Council

Speakers of the House of Assembly

References 

Vernanda Raymond, Clerk,  House of Assembly (acting)
.

Dominica
Dominica
Government of Dominica